Elmer William Morgan (May 8, 1910 – July 10, 1985) was a professional American football player who played offensive lineman for four seasons for the New York Giants. 

Born in Portland, Oregon, Morgan attended high school at Medford High School in Medford, Oregon and played college football for the University of Oregon.

References

1910 births
1985 deaths
Sportspeople from Medford, Oregon
Sportspeople from Canby, Oregon
American football offensive guards
New York Giants players
Oregon Ducks football players
Players of American football from Portland, Oregon
North Medford High School alumni